Shooting at the 2016 South Asian Games were held in Guwahati, India from 10 – 15 February 2016.

Medalists

Men's events

Women's events

Medal table

References

External links
 2016 South Asian Games final results (PDF), p. 82-94

2016 South Asian Games
Events at the 2016 South Asian Games
South Asian Games
Shooting at the South Asian Games